Witter is a civil parish in County Down, Northern Ireland. It is situated in the historic barony of Ards Upper.

Townlands
Inishargy civil parish contains the following townlands:

Ballyedock (also known as Carrstown)
Ballyfinragh
Ballygalget
Ballymarter
Ballyquintin
Ballywhollart
Carrstown (also known as Ballyedock)
Keentagh
Killydressy
Tara
Tieveshilly
Tullycarnan

See also
List of civil parishes of County Down

References